Park Byeong-ju or Pak Pyong-ju (박병주) may refer to:
 Park Byung-joo (born 1942), South Korean footballer
 Park Byeong-ju (born 1985), South Korean footballer
 Park Byeong-ju (skier) (born 1979), South Korean cross-country skier